Rachid Lajane (born 4 June 1986) is a Moroccan former professional footballer who last played for Woodlands Wellington of the Singapore S.League, in 2010.

Woodlands Wellington

Added to Singapore's Woodlands Wellington for the 2010 season as the fourth foreigner, on the recommendation of Moroccan coach Laakkad Abdelhadi, to resuscitate the club's front line. Lajane made his debut for the club in a 0–4 loss to Etoile in the S.League, going on to make 13 more appearances with zero goals, his final game was a 0–3 league defeat to Gombak United.

References

External links 
 Soccerway listing

1986 births
Living people
Moroccan expatriate footballers
Association football forwards
Moroccan footballers
Association football midfielders
Expatriate footballers in Singapore
Singapore Premier League players
Woodlands Wellington FC players